Ficus filosus, common name: the threaded fig shell,  is a species of sea snail, a marine gastropod mollusk in the family Ficidae, the fig shells.

Description
The shell size varies between 47 mm and 120 mm

Distribution
This species is distributed in the Pacific Ocean along Japan and Australia

References

 Verhaeghe, M. & Poppe, G. T., 2000 A Conchological Iconography (3), The Family Ficidae page(s): 12

External links
 

Ficidae
Gastropods described in 1892